Josef Ferstl (born 29 December 1988) is a German World Cup alpine ski racer, focusing on the speed events of Downhill and Super-G. He has competed in three World Championships and the 2018 Winter Olympics. Ferstl made his World Cup debut in 2007 and has two victories, both 

His father is West German alpine racer Sepp Ferstl, who won the Hahnenkamm downhill in Kitzbühel in 1978 and 1979.  later in 2019, the younger Ferstl became the first German to win a Super-G at Kitzbühel, and the trophy was presented to him by

World Cup results

Season standings

Race podiums
 2 wins – (2 SG)
 2 podiums – (2 SG); 16 top tens – (8 DH, 8 SG)

World Championship results

Olympic results

References

External links
 
 
 Josef Ferstl at Head Skis
 
 Josef Ferstl at the Deutscher Skiverband 

1988 births
German male alpine skiers
Living people
Olympic alpine skiers of Germany
Alpine skiers at the 2018 Winter Olympics
Alpine skiers at the 2022 Winter Olympics
People from Traunstein
Sportspeople from Upper Bavaria